Hankou Cultural Sports Centre (Simplified Chinese: 汉口文化体育中心) is a multi-use stadium in Wuhan, China.  It is currently used mostly for football matches.  The stadium holds 20,000 people.

Competitions
2009 AFC U-19 Women's Championship
2015 AFC U-16 Women's Championship

External links
Official site

References

Sports venues in Wuhan
Football venues in Wuhan